The men's 5000 metres event at the 1995 Pan American Games was held at the Estadio Atletico "Justo Roman" on 24 March. This was the first time that this distance was contested by women at the Pan American Games replacing the 3000 metres.

Results

References

Athletics at the 1995 Pan American Games
1995
Pan